The Cook County, Illinois, general election was held on November 2, 2004.

Primaries were held March 16, 2004.

Elections were held for Clerk of the Circuit Court, Recorder of Deeds, State's Attorney, Board of Review district 3, three seats on the Water Reclamation District Board, and judgeships on the Circuit Court of Cook County.

Election information
2004 was a presidential election year in the United States. The primaries and general elections for Cook County races coincided with those for federal races (President, House, and Senate) and those for state elections.

Voter turnout

Primary election
Voter turnout in Cook County during the primaries was 35.02%. The city of Chicago saw 38.58% turnout and suburban Cook County saw 31.34% turnout.

General election
The general election saw 74.75% turnout, with 2,088,727 ballots cast. Chicago saw 75.13% turnout and suburban Cook County saw 74.36% turnout.

Clerk of the Circuit Court 

In the 2004 Clerk of the Circuit Court of Cook County election,  incumbent first-term Clerk Dorothy A. Brown, a Democrat, was reelected.

Primaries

Democratic

Republican

General election
Endorsements

Results

Recorder of Deeds 

In the 2004 Cook County Recorder of Deeds election, incumbent Recorder of Deeds Eugene Moore, a Democrat, was reelected. Moore had first been appointed in 1999 (after Jesse White resigned to become Illinois Secretary of State), and had been elected to a full-term in 2000.

Primaries

Democratic

Republican

General election
Republican nominee Cox had declared that his intent in seeking the office was to push for its elimination, as he argued that the office was an unnecessary duplication of services and had become a "model of waste and corruption".

Endorsements

Results

State's Attorney 

In the 2004 Cook County State's Attorney election,  incumbent second-term State's Attorney Richard A. Devine, a Democrat, was reelected.

Primaries

Democratic
In the Democratic primary, incumbent Dick Devine defeated challenger Tommy H. Brewer (who had previously, in 1994, run unsuccessfully for the Democratic nomination Cook County Sheriff).

Republican

General election
Endorsements

Results

Cook County Board of Review

In the 2004 Cook County Board of Review election, one seat, Democratic-held, was up for election. The incumbent won reelection.

The Cook County Board of Review has its three seats rotate the length of terms. In a staggered fashion (in which no two seats have coinciding two-year terms), the seats rotate between two consecutive four-year terms and a two-year term.

3rd district

Incumbent second-term member Robert Shaw, a Democrat last reelected in 2002, lost reelection, being unseated by in the Democratic primary by Larry R. Rogers, Jr., who went on to win the general election unopposed. Rogers' margin-of-victory over Shaw in the Democratic primary was narrow, at 1,087 votes (equal to 0.37 of votes cast). This election was to a four-year term.

Primaries

Democratic

Republican
No candidates, ballot-certified or formal write-in, ran in the Republican primary.

General election

Water Reclamation District Board 

In the 2004 Metropolitan Water Reclamation District of Greater Chicago election, three of the nine seats on the Metropolitan Water Reclamation District of Greater Chicago board were up for election in an at-large election.

Judicial elections 
Pasrtisan elections were held for judgeships on the Circuit Court of Cook County due to vacancies. Retention elections were also held for the Circuit Court.

Partisan elections were also held for subcircuit courts judgeships due to vacancies. Retention elections were held for other judgeships.

Other elections
Coinciding with the primaries, elections were held to elect both the Democratic and Republican committeemen for the wards of Chicago.

See also 
 2004 Illinois elections

References 

Cook County
Cook County, Illinois elections
Cook County 2004
Cook County